Sandra Jean McPherson (born August 2, 1943) is an American poet.

Born in San Jose, California, McPherson received her B.A. at San José State University, and studied at the University of Washington, with Elizabeth Bishop and David Wagoner.  She considers her "literary mothers" to be Elizabeth Bishop, Carolyn Kizer, and Adrienne Rich.

She has taught at the Iowa Writer's Workshop, the Geraldine R. Dodge Poetry Festival, Haystack Portland State University, University of California at Berkeley Spring 1981 or 1982 as Roberta Holloway Visiting Lecturer, and the Art of the Wild Conference. She is a Professor Emerita at the University of California at Davis.
Having been a featured poet on the poetry circuits of Ohio, Kentucky, and Connecticut, she has also read in most states: Washington D.C., Louisiana, Georgia, Indiana, Utah, Texas, Iowa, Minnesota, Oklahoma, Oregon, Florida, Delaware, Virginia, Arkansas, Alabama, and California.

Her father, Walt McPherson, was head basketball coach at San Jose State and commissioner of the West Coast Athletic Conference.

Works
 A Pumpkin at New Year’s, Poetry online
 Black Soap, Poetry (February 1980)
 Eschatology, Poetry (April 1970)
 For Elizabeth Bishop, Poetry online
 Grouse, Poetry (March 2006)
 Lions , Poetry online
 Peddler, Poetry online
 Resigning from a Job in a Defense Industry , Poetry online
 Seaweeds, Poetry (November 1972)
 The Delicacy, Poetry online
 Triolet, Poetry (July 1973)
 Pisces Child, Poetry365

Ploughshares 
 A Vigil, 2 a.m., County Jail, Ploughshares (Spring 1999)
 In Her Image, Ploughshares (Spring 1999)
 Ridge Road, Ploughshares (Winter 1987)
 Sonnet for a Singer, Ploughshares (Winter 1987)

Books
 Elegies for the Hot Season, Indiana University Press (Bloomington), 1970
 Radiation, Ecco Press (New York City), 1973.
 The Year of Our Birth, Ecco Press, 1978.
 Sensing, Meadow Press (San Francisco), 1980.
 Patron Happiness, Ecco Press, 1983.
 Pheasant Flower, Owl Creek Press (Missoula, MT), 1985.
 Floralia, illustrations by Claire Van Vliet, Janus Press (Portland, OR), 1985.
 Responsibility for Blue, Trilobite Press (Denton, TX), 1985.
 At the Grave of Hazel Hall, Ives Street Press (Sweden, ME), 1988.
 Streamers, Ecco Press, 1988.
 Designating Duet, Janus Press (West Burke, VT), 1989.
 The God of Indeterminacy, University of Illinois Press, 1993.
 Edge Effect: Trails and Portrayals, University Press of New England (Hanover, NH), 1996.
 The Spaces between Birds: Mother/Daughter Poems, 1967–1995, University Press of New England, 1996.
 Beauty in Use, Janus Press, 1997.
 "A Visit to Civilization", Wesleyan, 2002.
 "Handmade Definition of Obscurity", Janus, 2005 (a broadside).
 "Expectation Days", Illinois, 2007.
 "Certain Uncollected Poems", Ostrakon, 2012.
 "Outline Scribe", Ostrakon, 2015.
 "The Danger Is", Salmon Poetry Press, 2018

Editor
 Journey from Essex: Poems for John Clare, Graywolf Press (Port Townsend, WA), 1981.
 The Pushcart Prize XIV: Best of the Small Presses, 1989-90, (with Bill Henderson and Laura Jensen), Pushcart Press (Wainscott, NY), 1989.
 "Swan Scythe Press", (Davis, CA), founder and editor, 1999-2011.
 Poetry Editor, California Quarterly (1985-7).  
 Poetry Editor, The Iowa Review (mid-1970s - 1980).
 Poetry Editor, Antioch Review (early 1980s).

Honors
 Ingram Merrill Foundation grants
 National Endowment of the Arts fellowships
 Guggenheim Foundation Fellowship
 American Academy and Institute of Arts and Letters award

References

Sources
Novel Guide

External links
 Sandra McPherson (1943 -), The Poetry Foundation
 Sandra McPherson, Harper's Magazine
 Finding aid to Sandra McPherson Papers at Special Collections Dept., University Library, University of California, Davis

1943 births
Living people
Iowa Writers' Workshop faculty
San Jose State University alumni
University of Washington alumni
University of California, Davis faculty
Place of birth missing (living people)